Rita Ann Moden Gardner,  (born 10 November 1955) is a British geographer and academic, specialising in geomorphology. Since January 2019, she has been Chief Executive of the Academy of Social Sciences. She taught at St Catherine's College, Oxford (1978–1979), King's College, London (1979–1994), and finally at Queen Mary and Westfield College (1994–1996) where she was Reader in Environmental Science. From 1996 to 2018, she was Director of the Royal Geographical Society: she was the learned society's first female director.

Honours
In the 2003 New Year Honours, Gardner was appointed Commander of the Order of the British Empire (CBE) "for services to geography". She is a Fellow of the Royal Geographical Society (FRGS), and a Fellow of the Academy of Social Sciences (FAcSS).

In 2016, she was awarded the Scottish Geographical Medal, the highest honour of the Royal Scottish Geographical Society, in recognition "of her outstandingly successful work in promoting Geography – in academic research, in schools, and in public life". She was also made an Honorary Fellow of the Royal Scottish Geographical Society (FRSGS) in 2016.

Selected works

References

1955 births
Living people
British geomorphologists
British women academics
Women geographers
20th-century geographers
Academics of the University of Oxford
Academics of King's College London
Academics of Queen Mary University of London
Commanders of the Order of the British Empire
Fellows of the Royal Geographical Society
Fellows of the Academy of Social Sciences
Fellows of the Royal Scottish Geographical Society